This is a list of dental schools located in Pakistan.

Dental seats

List of dental colleges

Punjab

Public

Private

Sindh

Public

Private

Khyber Pakhtunkhwa

Public

Private

Balochistan

Public

See also
Pakistan Medical and Dental Council (PMDC)

References

Dental schools recognized by PMDC

 
Pakistan
Dental schools